Qigxin is an oasis town in central Xinjiang Uyghur Autonomous Region of Northwest China. It is under the administration of Yanqi Hui Autonomous County in Bayin'gholin Mongol Autonomous Prefecture.

References

External links
Hudong Encyclopedia 

Populated places in Xinjiang
Township-level divisions of Xinjiang
Yanqi Hui Autonomous County